The Lawless Rider is a 1954 American black-and-white western film directed by Yakima Canutt and starring Johnny Carpenter, Frankie Darro and Noel Neill, and marketed by United Artists. Ed Wood helped co-write the screenplay, which was originally to be titled The Outlaw Marshall. The film was shot in 1952 but was not released until July 1954 due to cost overruns and legal difficulties.

Plot
The Bascom Ranch, owned by Texas Rose Bascom, is targeted by an outlaw gang with the intent to steal cattle off the ranch. Outlaw Freno Frost runs the rustling gang. One of the gang members is Jim Bascom, Texas Rose Bascom's wayward brother. When she discovers that her brother is running with the outlaws, she seeks help from the law. Sheriff Brown is unable or unwilling to help, so Texas Rose asks her boyfriend, U.S. Marshall Johnny Carpenter, to come to her aid. Johnny Carpenter shows up in town, in disguise, and impersonates the gunslinger Rod Tatum in order to infiltrate the outlaw gang. Texas Rose Bascom performs her fancy trick roping act for the townfolk, but ruffians interrupt the event. Confusion follows when the real Rod Tatum and the impersonator meet on the street.

Cast
Johnny Carpenter as Johnny Carpenter and Rod Tatum
Earl W. Bascom (a co-producer) as an outlaw
Noel Neill as Nancy James
Texas Rose Bascom as Texas Rose Bascom
Frankie Darro as Jim Bascom
Kenne Duncan as Freno Frost
Dale Barrell as The Kid
Douglass Dumbrille as Marshall Brady
Bud Osborne as Tulsa
Weldon Bascom as Sheriff Brown
Shirley Belger as Sis
Bob Burns as a rancher of the Saddle Kings Band
Roy Canada as Andy
Tap Canutt as Young Marshall
Frank "Red" Carpenter as Big Red
Fred Carson as Snake Eyes
Bill Chaney as Bill
Bill Coontz as Red Rock
Johnny Dew as Carson
Hank Caldwell as leader
Leonard P. Geer as Jack
Ray Morgan as Scar
Blackie Pickerel as Raven
Lou Roberson as Black Jack Ketchum
Frank Robbins as Larrabie
Lennie Smith as Lennie
Ted Smith as Ted
Tommy Thomas as a blacksmith

Sound track
 "Thinking of You", sung by Texas Rose Bascom

Stunts
 Weldon Bascom
 Tap Canutt
 Yakima Canutt, director
 Frank "Red" Carpenter
 Fred Carson
 Bill Coontz

Other credits and crew members
 Rudy DeSaxe, music
 William C. Thompson, director of cinematography
 Carlo Lodato, film editing
 Micky Meyers, costume design
 Bud Sweeney, makeup artist
 Willard Kirkham, assistant director
 Glen Glenn, sound
 Fred Grossi, still photography
 John C. Fuller, editor
 George N. Brown, transportation
 Winifred Gibson, script supervisor
 Sam Tilden, public relations

Producers
Alex Gordon, executive producer
Johnny Carpenter, producer
Edward D. Wood Jr., producer
Weldon Bascom, associate producer

Production history
The film was financed by a group of Mormons. The original budget was $20,000 but it went over budget. There were legal troubles which meant the film took two years to be released. Producer Alex Gordon became entangled in debt over the film's cost overruns and got Samuel Z. Arkoff involved in the negotiations to get the film released. Arkoff got Gordon out of the financial mess he was in and got the film released eventually through United Artists. Gordon would go on to make several other movies with Arkoff. Gordon's friend/ roommate Ed Wood worked on the movie's screenplay with the film's star Johnny Carpenter.

References

External links

1954 films
1954 Western (genre) films
American Western (genre) films
American black-and-white films
Films directed by Yakima Canutt
United Artists films
1950s English-language films
1950s American films